The Omaha Mavericks men's basketball statistical leaders are individual statistical leaders of the Omaha Mavericks men's basketball program in various categories, including points, assists, blocks, rebounds, and steals. Within those areas, the lists identify single-game, single-season, and career leaders. The Mavericks represent the University of Nebraska Omaha in the NCAA Division I Summit League.

Omaha began competing in intercollegiate basketball in 1910. However, the school's record book does not generally list records from before the 1950s, as records from before this period are often incomplete and inconsistent. Since scoring was much lower in this era, and teams played much fewer games during a typical season, it is likely that few or no players from this era would appear on these lists anyway.

An added complication in statistical recording is that Omaha did not begin playing in Division I until the 2012–13 season, having previously been in Division II. This is significant because the NCAA did not officially record assists, blocks, and steals in D-II until several years after it began doing so in D-I. The NCAA briefly recorded assists as a statistic in 1950–51 and 1951–52, before the NCAA first split into divisions in 1956. However, after 1952, assists were not officially recorded again in D-I until the 1983–84 season. Blocks and steals were first officially recorded in D-I in the 1985–86 season. By contrast, assists were not officially recorded in D-II until 1988–89, and blocks and steals were not officially recorded in that division until 1992–93. Nonetheless, Omaha's record books includes players in these stats before these seasons. These lists are updated through the end of the 2020–21 season.

Scoring

Rebounds

Assists

Steals

Blocks

References

Lists of college basketball statistical leaders by team
Statistical